(February 25, 1923 – April 22, 2017) was a Japanese-born executive of the Los Angeles branch of the food importer, Mutual Trading Company. He is sometimes credited with the idea of opening the first authentic sushi bar in the United States during the 1960s.

Life and work
Kanai was born February 25, 1923, in Ochiai Village, Toyotama County, Tokyo. He graduated from the Tokyo College of Commerce(today's Hitotsubashi University).

This was a company to bring in Japanese foodstuff as a co-op operation from Japan.

Kanai is sometimes credited with promoting the idea of opening a sushi counter on the premises of the Kawafuku restaurant in Little Tokyo, Los Angeles. This restaurant is said to be the first authentic "sushi bar" in the United States, with a trained sushi chef from Japan. Some sources agree that Kawafuku was the first American sushi bar, but merely acknowledge Mutual Trading as being the purveyor of sushi ingredients to the restaurant.

Kanai was decorated with the Order of the Rising Sun, Gold Rays with Rosette (kyokujitsu shōjushō) in Autumn 2009, recognized  for his contributions in establishing the overseas voting system (在外投票, zaigai tōhyō) for Japanese living outside their country, and for promoting Japanese food culture in the United States.

Noritoshi Kanai died at aged 94 on April 22, 2017.

Notes

References
Citations

Bibliography

Hitotsubashi University alumni
Japanese businesspeople
1923 births
2017 deaths
Businesspeople from Tokyo
Japanese emigrants to the United States